The Marion County Courthouse, located at 3rd and Williams Streets in Marion, Kansas, was built in 1906.  It was listed on the National Register of Historic Places in 1976.

It was designed by J.C. Holland and Frank Squires in Richardsonian Romanesque style.

References

Government buildings on the National Register of Historic Places in Kansas
Romanesque Revival architecture in Kansas
Government buildings completed in 1906
Marion County, Kansas
Courthouses in Kansas
1906 establishments in Kansas